In functional analysis, a weighted space is a space of functions under a weighted norm, which is a finite norm (or semi-norm) that involves multiplication by a particular function referred to as the weight.

Weights can be used to expand or reduce a space of considered functions. For example, in the space of functions from a set  to  under the norm  defined by: , functions that have infinity as a limit point are excluded. However, the weighted norm  is finite for many more functions, so the associated space contains more functions. Alternatively, the weighted norm  is finite for many fewer functions.

When the weight is of the form , the weighted space is called polynomial-weighted.

References

Functional analysis